Transportation in Mauritius is characterized by the network of roadways, ports, and airports. The island was originally only accessible by boat until 1922, when the first flight landed in Mauritius.

Rail transport

A public and industrial railway system existed from the 1860s to the 1960s. Due to persistent unprofitability from 1948 to 1953, it was finally closed in 1964. From 1964 to 2020, there were no railways in Mauritius. 

To cope with increasing road traffic congestion, a light rail system, Metro Express, has been proposed between Curepipe and Port Louis. The project consists of a number of phases; the first phase, Port Louis to Rose Hill, went operational in January 2020. When completed, the system would cover a distance of some 25 km, with some 19 stations, many located in town centres along the route with existing transport terminals. The end-to-end journey time would be approximately 41 minutes and coaches would be air-conditioned. Headways would vary by time of day, but are expected to be of the order of 6 minutes in peak periods. Access to stations would be by an integrated system of comfortable and reliable feeder buses. A 3.4-km branch with two stations will be built as well.

Motorized transport

History 
At the beginning of 1860, the transport of passengers and goods was undertaken by about 2,000 horses, 4,000 donkeys and 4,500 carriages and carts. With the advent of the railways, and later of motorized transport, animal based transport systems declined on the island.

In January 1901, the first two-seater car, imported by Goupilles & Cies, was disembarked. In October of that same year, the Union Regnard sugar estate (Now F.U.E.L) received the first motorized truck of British origin, capable of transporting up to 5 tons.

In 1930, the island had 3,016 vehicles: around 2,401 private cars, 300 taxis, 303 trucks, 92 buses and 220 motorcycles. In 1950, vehicles numbered in the 5,161 and went up to 13,291 in 1960 with the decline of the railways. In 1970, the number of vehicles nearly doubled, going to 25,389 motorised vehicles. This included 12,546 cars, 4,171 trucks, 722 buses and 5,383 motorcycles. Public transport, in the form of buses, grew in line with the demographic and economic growth of the island; buses numbered 186 in 1950, 488 in 1960, 722 in 1970 and 1,490 in 1980.

, 580,629 vehicles were registered on the island. Of these, 299,998 were cars and dual-purpose vehicles (cars capable of carrying a certain load of goods), and 216,863 were motorcycles and autocycles (light motorcycles).

National Transport Authority 
The National Transport Authority (NTA) is the governmental department established under the Road Traffic Act in 1980 whose main responsibility is the regulation and control of road transport in Mauritius and Rodrigues. It falls under the responsibility of the Ministry of Public Infrastructure, Land Transport and Shipping. The responsibility for the administration of the NTA rests with the Road Transport Commissioner.

The NTA also has a board constituted under section 73 of the Road Traffic Act. The Board consists of a Chairman appointed by the Minister and 10 other members. The board is responsible to hear and decide on the applications for licenses for the transport of goods and passengers; and disciplinary proceedings instituted against transport operators, drivers, and conductors of public service vehicles for offences committed under the Act.

The other responsibilities of this governmental department are:
 registration and transfer of ownership of motor vehicles;
 licensing of public service vehicles and goods vehicles as well as petrol service stations;
 collection of road tax and other licence fees;
 examination of motor vehicles as to their road-worthiness;
 licensing of bus conductors;
 enforcement of road transport legislation and monitoring the level of service of public transport;
 enforcement of parking regulations;
 keeping statistics relating to motor vehicles; and
 planning of new transport services.

Road network 
The percentage of paved roads is 98%. The number of vehicles per kilometre of road is 209. 

The motorway network includes three main motorways:

M1 (Port Louis – Plaisance Dual Carriageway) goes from Port Louis to the International airport, also connecting Moka, Beau Bassin-Rose Hill, Quatre Bornes, Vacoas-Phoenix and Curepipe.
M2 (Port Louis – Sottise Dual Carriageway) goes from Port Louis to Grand-Baie in the North, it also connects Pamplemousses.
M3 (Terre Rouge – Verdun – Trianon Link Road and Bagatelle – Valentina Link Road) bypasses Port Louis.
M4 (Airport – Bel Air – Point Blanc – Forbach) is in early stages of contracting.

Bus network 
Mauritius has a widespread bus network with around 220 bus lines and roughly 900 bus stops. They are operated by major companies (Mauritius Bus Transport, National Transport Corporation (NTC), United Bus Service (UBS)), as well as smaller companies (Rose Hill Transport (RHT), Triolet Bus Service (TBS) and others) and various individual operators that are organized in regional Bus Owners Co-operative Societies (BOCS). The bus prices are regulated by the Government of Mauritius. However, there is no such thing as an operator independent ticket which could be used across the island.

Water transport

Ports and harbours 
Port Louis is the main port in Mauritius. Port Mathurin is the main port on Rodrigues Island. Mauritius was only accessible by boat until 1922, when the first flight landed in Mauritius.

Merchant marine 
total:
8 ships (1,000 GT or over) totalling 550142 GT/
ships by type:
cargo 2, combination bulk 2, container 2, cargo 2
note:
includes some foreign-owned ships registered here as a flag of convenience: Belgium 1, India 3, Norway 1, Switzerland 2 (2002 est.)

Air transport

History 
The first recorded flight taking off from Mauritius was undertaken on 2 June 1922 by Major F.W. Honnet. The plane, a mono-engine biplane, christened Maurice, had come by boat. For the inaugural flight, the land at the Gymkhana, Vacoas was converted into an improvised airport.

On 10 September 1933, two French pilots, Maurice Samat and Paul Louis Lemerle, flew from Reunion Island to Mauritius on a Potez 43 plane called Monique. The pilots landed in Mon-Choisy in the north of the island. On 4 October of the same year, a Mauritian pilot, Jean Hily, took off from Mon-Choisy for Réunion island. However, he never made it and was lost at sea. For some years that followed, the Mon-Choisy strip was used as an airport for the rare airplanes that landed on the island. However, in 1942, with the entry of Japan into the Second World War, the island gained a strategic importance in the Indian Ocean and thus the British government hastily built a new airport in the south of the island at Plaisance. On 24 November 1943, the first military airplane, a Dakota of the Royal Air Force (R.A.F) coming from Nairobi with a stopover at Madagascar, landed in Plaisance.

In 1945, with the end of the war, the airport was opened to the civil aviation. Thus, on 10 February of that year, a Junker 52 of the Réseau des Liaisons Aériennes Francaises (R.L.A.F), later known as Air France, landed in Plaisance. Since 1945, the R.L.A.F operated the Paris-Mauritius line. The journey of 6 days and 7 stops included Antananarivo and Reunion island. In 1946, the R.A.F handed over the Plaisance airport to the Mauritian authorities.

Air France became the first commercial aviation company to come to Mauritius. As from 1947, it's DC4, transporting 44 passengers, undertook the Paris-Mauritius in 3 days, including night time flight, with 12 stops in between. The following year, the British company SkyWays initiated a weekly flight on the Plaisance-Nairobi line. The introduction of Boeings as from 1961 sensibly reduced the travel time on this line. Even though Mauritius was a British colony, the British Overseas Airways Corporation (B.O.A.C) began to come to Mauritius only from 1962. The Mauritius-London itinerary took 26 hours, with 4 stops. In 1967, a Boeing 707, capable of carrying 160 passengers was introduced on the Paris-Mauritius line, decreasing the travel time to 18 hours.

Initially, Mauritian civil and commercial aviation developed under the impulsion of Rogers & Co Company. The aviation department within Rogers was created by Amédée Maingard on his return from the Second World War. In June 1967, the national company, Air Mauritius was created. The Mauritian government, British Airways, Air France and Air India were the initial stakeholders in this initiative, with Rogers an active supporter. Amédée Maingard became the first president of Air Mauritius and Jean Ribet the general manager. In December 1972, Air Mauritius landed a Piper-Navajo (twin-engined plane of 6 places), rented from Air Madagascar, in Rodrigues. Then, as from 1975, a Havilland Twin Otter of 16 places was used on the Mauritius-Rodrigues route.

Airports 
As of 2014, there are 2 airports in Mauritius and its dependencies.

See also 
 Rail transport in Mauritius
 Air Mauritius – national airline

References

External links 
 Ministry of Public Infrastructure, Land Transport & Shipping
 Taxi Mauritius Owners Association